Secret of the Wasteland is a 1941 American Western film directed by Derwin Abrahams and written by Gerald Geraghty. The film stars William Boyd, Andy Clyde, Brad King, Soo Yong, Barbara Britton, Douglas Fowley and Keith Richards. The film was released on November 15, 1941, by Paramount Pictures. The on-screen title is Secrets of the Wasteland ("Secrets" is plural, "Wasteland" is singular).

Plot

Hopalong Cassidy and his two accomplices, California and Johnny, are engaged in an archaeological expedition.

Cast 
 William Boyd as Hopalong Cassidy
 Andy Clyde as California Carlson
 Brad King as Johnny Nelson
 Soo Yong as Moy Soong
 Barbara Britton as Jennifer Kendall
 Douglas Fowley as Slade Salters
 Keith Richards as Clay Elliott
 Richard Loo as Quan 
 Lee Tung Foo as Doy Kee 
 Gordon Hart as Dr. Malcolm Birdsall
 Earl Gunn as Henchman Clanton
 Ian MacDonald as Henchman Hollister
 John Rawlins as Williams 
 Roland Got as Yeng 
 Hal Price as Professor Balto Stubbs

References

External links 
 
 
 
 

1941 films
American black-and-white films
Paramount Pictures films
American Western (genre) films
1941 Western (genre) films
Hopalong Cassidy films
Films directed by Derwin Abrahams
1940s English-language films
1940s American films